The 2022 South and Central American Beach Handball Championship was the second edition of the tournament, took place in Maceió, Brazil from 10 to 13 April 2022. It acted as the South and Central American qualifying tournament for the 2022 Beach Handball World Championships and the 2022 World Beach Games.

Participating teams

Men

Women

Men's tournament

Qualification round

Knockout stage

Bracket

5th place match

Final ranking

Women's tournament

Qualification round

Knockout stage

Bracket

5th place match

Final ranking

References

External links
SCA Handball official website

South and Central American Beach Handball Championship
South and Central American Beach Handball Championship
South
South and Central American Beach Handball Championship
South and Central American Beach Handball Championship